The Countess of Parma (Italian: La contessa di Parma) is a 1937 Italian "white-telephones" comedy film directed by Alessandro Blasetti and starring Elisa Cegani, Antonio Centa and María Denis. Marcella, a mannequin working in a fashion store in Turin, falls in love with an Italian International football player whose aunt has just acquired the store intending to replace its reliance on French fashions with Italian designs. Blasetti later described it as his only "white telephone" film, although his 1939 comedy Backstage has also been noted for its similar characteristics.

It was shot at the Fert Studios in Turin and on location around the city including at the Stadio Municipale and the Mirafiori district where the racetrack scenes were staged. Exterior shots were also taken at the Avigliana Lakes and the resort town of Sestriere to the west of the city on the French border. Filming began in November 1936 and lasted through the winter, with the final shots being taken at Sestriere's ski resort.

Cast 
 Elisa Cegani as Marcella 
 Antonio Centa as Gino Vanni 
 María Denis as Adriana 
 Umberto Melnati as Carrani 
 Osvaldo Valenti as Duca di Fadda 
 Nunzio Filogamo as Conte di Sebasta
 Ugo Ceseri as Marco 
 Pina Gallini as Marta Rossi 
 Marichetta Stoppa as Una Guardarobiera 
 Giannina Chiantoni as La sarta della casa di mode 
 Mario Lembo as Il tassista 
 Pina Valli as Un'indossatrice 
 Mirica Albis as Un'altra indossatrice

References

Bibliography 
 Liehm, Mira. Passion and Defiance: Film in Italy from 1942 to the Present. University of California Press, 1984.
 Moliterno, Gino. Historical Dictionary of Italian Cinema. Scarecrow Press, 2008.
 Paulicelli, Eugenia. Fashion Under Fascism: Beyond the Black Shirt. Berg, 2004.

External links 
 
 The Countess of Parma at Variety Distribution

1937 films
Italian comedy films
Italian black-and-white films
1937 comedy films
1930s Italian-language films
Films directed by Alessandro Blasetti
Films set in Turin
Films scored by Giovanni Fusco
Italian association football films
Films about fashion
1930s Italian films